The Central Soil Salinity Research Institute (acronym CSSRI) is an autonomous institute of higher learning, established under the umbrella of Indian Council of Agricultural Research (ICAR) by the Ministry of Agriculture, Government of India for advanced research in the field of soil sciences.  The institute is located on Kachawa Road in Karnal, in the state of Haryana,  from the Indian capital of New Delhi.

Profile 

Central Soil Salinity Research Institute (CSSRI) had its origin in Hisar, Haryana, on 1 March 1969, as per recommendations of an Indo-American team, employed to assist the Indian Council of Agricultural Research in developing a comprehensive water management program for India.  However, by October, 1969, the institute was shifted to its present premises in Karnal and a year later, the Central Rice Research Station, Canning Town, West Bengal was merged with CSSRI.

The institute has a satellite unit in Bharuch, which was originally started in Anand in 1989, but moved to Bharuch in 2003 and hosts the coordinating unit of AICRP on Management of Salt Affected Soils and Use of Saline Water in Agriculture with a network of eight research centres located in different agro ecological regions of the country at Agra, Bapatala, Bikaner, Gangawati, Hisar, Indore, Kanpur and Tiruchirapalli. The coordinating unit of AICRP on Water Management was a part of CSSRI from early seventies till 1990 when it was moved to Rahuri in Maharashtra.

The main achievements of CSSRI may be listed as:
 Reclamation of alkaline soils with the addition of chemical amendments.
 Reclamation of saline soils through subsurface drainage.
 Development and release of salt tolerant crop varieties of rice, wheat and mustard.
 Reclamation of salt affected soils through salt tolerant trees.
 Development of for the salt affected areas of vertisols and coastal regions.
 Development of subsurface drainage technology for waterlogged saline soils.
 Replenishment of depleting water tables by artificial ground water recharge.

CSSRI manages an International Training Centre under an Indo-Dutch collaboration since 2001. It offers post graduate level programs in association with State Agricultural Universities (SAUs), Indian Institute of Technology (IIT) and other Universities.

The institute has undertaken several national and international projects.
 International Rice Research Institute (IRRI) sponsored rice improvement program
 Australian Centre for International Agricultural Research (ACIAR) sponsored Indo-Australian program for wheat improvement
 IRRI, Philippines and CIMMYT, Mexico sponsored program of cereal based systems

Divisions

The institute is engaged in multidisciplinary research activities which are carried out through four divisions.

Division of Soil and Crop Management

The Division conducts research on resource conservation technologies and cost effective farming system models. It prepares and maintains digital databases of salt affected soils and conducts periodic assessment of soil resources. It also focusses on agroforestry on salt affected soils.

Division of Irrigation and Drainage Engineering

The Division attends to the areas related to groundwater recharge technologies, subsurface drainage for amelioration of waterlogged saline soils and decision support systems for ground water contaminations. The Division has project partnership with INNO-Asia.

Division of Crop Improvement

Development of saline and alkaline tolerant crops such as rice, wheat and mustard through conventional breeding and modern molecular and physiological approaches is the primary activity of the Division.

The Division of Social Science Research

The Division undertakes studies on the various aspects of land reclamation in relation to rural development.

Vision, Mission and Mandate

Mandate: The institute is mandated with:
 Conduct of basic and advanced research on reclamation and management of salt affected soils and development of suitable agrochemical, biological and hydraulic technologies for the use of irrigation water for the development of various agro-ecological zones for sustainable production.
 Generation, assessment and propagation of preventive/ameliorative technology.
 Maintenance and dissemination of information on resource inventories for the management of salt affected soils and waters.
 Act as a fulcrum for researches on salinity management and coordination of research between the various universities, institutions and agencies in the country for developing and testing location–specific technologies.
 Provide advanced training and consultancy in salinity researches in India.
 Liaison with national and international agencies for the achievement of the above objectives.

Regional Research Stations
CSSRI has three regional stations for a wider national coverage, each located at Bharuch, Canning Town and Lucknow.

Facilities

Publication and Supporting Service Unit

PSS unit is responsible for information dissemination of the scientific researches of the Institute and has published 233 research papers on national and international journals, published 25 books and 60 bulletins.

Computer Centre

The institute is equipped with a modern computer centre since 1988 which acts as the communication hub of the institute. The centre is supported by an ICT infrastructure, LAN network and modern hardware and software. It provides system support in the procurement, maintenance, training, MIS reports, document processing, conduct of computer based exams and IT support for administration. It also maintains the web site of the institute.

Health Care Center

The Institute manages a Health Care Centre with the facility to accommodate 5 inpatients, a senior allopathic medical officer, a part-time ayurvedic medical officer, pharmacist, support staff, clinical laboratory with diagnostic equipment and a pharmacy. A modern fitness centre also operates in the health care centre.

Library

CSSRI library os a well stocked one, holding a collection of 14668 books and 7967 bound journals, consisting of publications of FAO, IRRI, UNESCO, ILRI, ICID, IFPRI, ASA and ASAE. The library subscribes to 69 national and 25 international journals other than 15 gratis journals. It also maintains a digital repository with digital magazines such as SOIL, AGRIS and Plant Gene.

PME Cell

Research Priority setting, Monitoring and Evaluation (PME) cell is the monitoring unit of the Institute for assisting the scientists and scholars in the allocation of research areas and the monitoring and evaluation of the projects. It helps the scientists in the maintenance of database, report generation and compilation, generation and publication of research documents.

Technology Management Unit

Technology Management Unit is equipped with and manages:
 sodic and saline micro-plots for creating desired stress levels of sodicity and salinity
 environmentally controlled glass house for growing crops and monitoring their genetic resources
 Transgenic Greenhouse, under Indo-US ABSP II program
 Central laboratory with modern equipment

The institute has an administrative department, a Hindi Cell and a workshop to attend to the relevant areas of activities.

All India Coordinated Project for Research (AICRP)

The institute is the coordinating unit for the All India Coordinated Project for Research on Management of Salt Affected Soils and Use of Saline Water in Agriculture. The research is conducted at nine centres viz. Agra, Bapatla, Gangawati, Kanpur, Indore, Bikaner, Pali, Hisar and Tiruchirapalli.

The project is mandated with the responsibility to:
 Conduct survey and characterize the salt affected soils and the quality of ground water in various irrigation commands.
 Develop guidelines and standardize procedures for the assessment of irrigation waters.
 Conduct studies on the effect of poor quality water on soil and crops.
 Prescribe practice norms for utilization of water with high salinity/ alkalinity and toxic ions.
 Prepare strategies for the reclamation of salt affected soils.
 Prescribe alternate methods of using salt affected soils by way of Agroforestry, bio-drainage and multi-enterprise cultivation such as medicinal and aromatic plants.
 Identify and develop crop cultivars and trees suitable for cultivation in salinity and alkalinity soil conditions.

Awards and recognitions
CSSRI has been recognised for its efforts by way of several awards.
 ICAR Best Institute Award for the year 1998
 "Sardar Patel Outstanding ICAR Institution Award" for the year 2009
 Groundwater Augmentation Award- 2009 of Ministry of Water Resources (Government of India)
 Ganesh Shankar Vidyarthi Hindi Krishi Patrika Puraskar" for the year 2009
 Ganesh Shankar Vidyarthi Hindi Krishi Patrika Puraskar" for the year 2008

Publications

CSSRI has published many books, some of the notable ones are:
 
 
 
 
 
 
 
 
 
 
 
 
 
 
 
 
 

The institute has also published many technical bulletins, newsletters, popular articles and research papers.

See also

 Agriculture
 Agroecological restoration
 Agroecosystem
 Agroecosystem analysis
 Agronomy
 Ecology
 Organic agriculture
 Soil Science

References

External links
 Publications list on Krishikosh
 Reference on Academia.edu
 Reference on Research gate
 Reference on FAO site

Agroecology
Agricultural research institutes in India
Environmental impact of agriculture
Environmental issues in India
Research institutes in Haryana
1969 establishments in Haryana
Research institutes established in 1969